Rudolf Roessler (German: Rößler; 22 November 1897 – 11 December 1958) was a Protestant German and dedicated anti-Nazi. During the interwar period, Roessler was a lively cultural journalist, with a focus on theatre. In 1933 while a refugee, he moved to Switzerland and established a small publishing firm in Lucerne known as Vita Nova that published works of exiled writers. Late in the summer of 1942, Roessler ran the Lucy spy ring, an anti-Nazi Soviet espionage operation that was part of the Rote Drei while working for Rachel Dübendorfer through the cut-out Christian Schneider. Roessler was able to provide a great quantity of high-quality intelligence, around 12000 typed pages, sourced from the German High Command of planned operations on the Eastern Front, usually within a day of operational decisions being made. Later in the war, Roessler was able to provide the Soviet Union with intelligence on the V-1 and V-2 missiles. During the Cold War, Roessler reactivated his network and spied on NATO countries in Western Europe under orders from the military intelligence services of the Czechoslovak Socialist Republic, until he was arrested by the Swiss authorities and convicted of espionage in 1953.

Early life 
Roessler was born on 22 November 1897 in Kaufbeuren, Kingdom of Bavaria. He was the son of a Lutheran Bavarian Forestry Official. Roessler graduated from high school in Augsburg at the age of 17. Following the start of World War I Roessler was drafted into the Imperial German Army in 1916 and served as a soldier in Berlin.

After the end of the war in 1918, he studied theology in Augsburg. Roessler, a liberal conservative, became a pacifist and an opponent of Nazism. He started working as a journalist at the Augsburger Postzeitung, a German daily newspaper which was one of the most important Catholic newspapers in Germany until it was banned by the National Socialists in 1935 and the Augsburger Allgemeine Zeitung, a daily newspaper printed in Bavaria. In 1922, Roessler founded the Augsburger Literary Society. In 1928, he became director of the Christian-conservative Dt. Bühnenvolksbund in Berlin, an association for the advancement of German theatre stage people. For the next two years, Roessler edited the magazines Form und Sinn ("Form and Sense") and the Deutsche Bühnenblätter, a theatre magazine and was co-editor of the Nationaltheater. In 1930, he co-wrote Thespis : das Theaterbuch (Thespis: the theater book) along with several other people including the German art historian Oskar Fischel, German writer Walther Holländer and Austro-German writer, poet and art critic Theodor Däubler.

In Berlin, he was a member of the Herren Klub, a prestigious gentleman's club, where he met senior officers from the German military, many who would later become his contacts within Germany and assist with the disclosure of classified information. In 1933, he was expelled from the Dt. Bühnenvolksbund association by the Nazis.

In January 1934 and while still in Berlin, he co-founded the Vita Nova Verlag ("New Life Publisher") publishing house in Lucerne, Switzerland along with the Catholic bookseller Josef Stocker and the financier Henriette Racine. Stocker had been encouraged to help co-found the publishing firm by Jesuit and Roman Catholic priest and theological philosopher Otto Karrer. Vita Nova was an anti-Nazi publishing house that primarily published German writers in exile. Vita Nova published some fifty brochures and books that attacked both Nazism and Stalinism, contrasting them with the Christian values of the older Germany and Russia. The small firm also published books that were critical of Francoist Spain. Indeed, the firm provided the only real publishing house for exiled Christian, Catholic, Protestant and Orthodox writer and playwrights to publish their work.

In May 1934, Roessler emigrated to Switzerland as a refugee with his wife Olga, with the help of his friend, Xaver Schnieper, who Roessler had met during his studies in drama in Germany. The Nazi regime revoked his German citizenship in 1937. In 1939, Roessler became a member of the group that was associated with the left-wing Catholic journal Die Entscheidung (Decision) that was published by Xaver Schnieper.

World War II

On 30 May 1938, Roessler was visited by two of his contacts, the German generals Fritz Thiele and Rudolf Christoph Freiherr von Gersdorff, who would eventually become the officer in charge of the intelligence department of Army Group Centre in the Eastern Front. Roessler was provided with an Enigma machine and the latest shortwave transmitter and told to start listening for messages from Thiele who was stationed in the Bendlerblock. The messages were sent using the call-sign RAHS. A typical day for Roessler was to receive transmissions via the Broadcasting Center during his work day, and rebroadcast that information to the Russian military after leaving work for the evening.

In the summer of 1939, Xaver Schnieper approached Roessler and invited him to work for Swiss Intelligence. Roessler accepted the position on the condition that the offer was official. At that time, Schnieper was working as a junior officer in the Swiss Intelligence agency Büro Ha at the time located near Teufen and he introduced Roessler to Major Hans Hausamann. Roessler was one of the most important sources of intelligence for the Büro Ha.

During his career, Roessler provided intelligence to the Soviet Union, Czechoslovakia, Switzerland and the United Kingdom, at the minimum. He was often able to deliver accurate intelligence within one day of the orders being issued. For instance, a German army commander found a copy of his own orders in the Red Army headquarters building in the Polish town of Łomża when his unit occupied it after wresting it from the Russians. This was reported to the German high command, yet they were unable to find the leak.

Operation Citadel
In early March 1943, Hitler planned a massive offensive against the Kursk salient known as Operation Citadel in the hope of regaining the initiative in the east. On 15 April 1943, Hitler signed Order Number 6 to begin the offensive. Within 24 hours Alexander Foote had informed Soviet intelligence. Roessler's intelligence wasn't only strategic in nature; he also supplied the Soviets with detailed information on the new German Panther tank.

Roessler's Sources in World War II
The record of messages transmitted show that Roessler had four important sources. It was never discovered who they were. The four sources whose codenames were Werther, Teddy, Olga, and Anna were responsible for 42.5 percent of the intelligence sent from Switzerland to the Soviet Union.

The search for the identity of those sources has created a very large body of work of varying quality and offering various conclusions. Several theories can be dismissed immediately including by Foote and several other writers that the code names reflected the sources' access type rather than their identity, for example that Werther stood for Wehrmacht, Olga for Oberkommando der Luftwaffe, Anna for Auswärtiges Amt (Foreign Office) as the evidence does not support it. Alexander Radó made this claim in his memoirs, that were examined in a Der Spiegel article. Three and a half years before his death, Roessler described the identity of the four sources to a confidant. They were a German major who was in charge of the Abwehr before Wilhelm Canaris, Hans Bernd Gisevius, Carl Goerdeler and a General Boelitz, who was then deceased.

The most reliable study by the CIA Historical Review Program concluded that of the four sources, the most important source was Werther. The study stated he was likely Wehrmacht General Hans Oster, other Abwehr officers working with Swiss intelligence, or Swiss intelligence on its own.  There was no evidence to link the other three codenames to known individuals. The CIA believed that the German sources gave their reports to Swiss General Staff, who in turn supplied Roessler with information that the Swiss wanted to pass to the Soviets.

Arrest
Roessler along with Paul Böttcher, Rachel Dübendorfer, the courier Tamara Vigier, and Christian Schneider were arrested on 19 May 1944. On 22–23 October 1945, the Swiss military court sentenced each to two years. Roessler was incarcerated at the prison of Lausanne until his release on 6 September 1944.

Cold War

Roessler was arrested again on 9 March 1953, at the same time as Xaver Schnieper.

Under interrogation Roessler admitted that he had been contacted by Karel Sedlacek in 1947, who at the time was the Czechoslovak Socialist Republic's Military Attaché in Bern. Sedlacek knew Schnieper well and he also knew that both Schnieper and Roessler as freelance journalists would be struggling to make ends meet. Sedlacek then ordered Roessler, via an intermediary, to reactivate his wartime Rote Kapelle spy ring. Roessler, by virtue of his wartime reputation, was giving a sweeping brief. He was told to report all military and air force matters in Western Europe, the U.K., and Spain under Franco, and in particular to concentrate on infiltrating the United States military and Intelligence operations in Western Europe. Roessler trial was held on 2 November 1953, where he was charged with spying on West Germany for Communist Czechoslovakia. He was sentenced to twenty-one months in prison, minus the time he in detention awaiting the trial. Roessler was imprisoned for nine months and released in early 1954.

After he was released from jail, Roessler spent his last years living quietly in Kriens. He continued to write. His articles, which were unsigned, appeared in the Lucerne daily newspaper, the Social Democratic Party of Switzerland, Freie Innerschweiz. Roessler continued to argue against West German rearmament and for international solidarity. The articles can be split into two categories. The first category was short articles of one to two pages and that focused on a part of a larger topic. The second and more important was articles that were on specific areas of interest, ran to four or five pages and covered subjects within economic, social, colonial and security policy. These bigger articles often contained a number of abbreviations that were subject to change, so it was not possible for the reader to determine who the author was. Roessler was disillusioned with the Cold War, particularly after his trial, particularly when he was accused of spying in favour of the Soviet Union. Therefore, his work at the newspaper was not formally recognized. Even this obituary failed to mention his work there.

Roessler was not a Social Democrat. So it was difficult to determine how his political analysis was affected by his articles being published in a social-democratic daily newspaper, as other sources on his life, politics and cultural outlook have so far been lacking. In a telephone call to the Freie Innerschweiz on 29 May 1991, his friend, Xaver Schnieper confirmed that Roessler would certainly not have written anything that contradicted his own opinion.

Roessler was committed to the socially disadvantaged, combined with a criticism of the idea that technology and armament were the only way to a better world. He had aversion to the hysteria of the Cold War and its associated militarism that made him appear more left-wing today than many social democrats at the time.

Analysis
There are a number of sources that claim that the Red Three was functioning before the war and that Roessler, as Lucy, sent information to the Soviets that provided advanced warning of Hitler's impending attack on Russia. However, on examination of the radio messages that were transmitted by the group, proves that Rachel Dübendorfer didn't form a clandestine relationship with Roessler until the late summer of 1942.

Roessler's value to the Red Three and the Soviets derived entirely from his sources in Germany. This context is probably misleading, as the CIA believed that the German sources gave their intelligence to Swiss General Staff, who in turn supplied Roessler with information that the Swiss wanted to pass to the Soviets.

Literature
 C.P.S. "Le Jugement Contre Roessler Et Schnieper." Tribune De Lausanne 6 November 1953: n. pag. Print. 
 
 "Soviet Agents' Work Revealed." Prescott Evening Courier [Prescott, Arizona] 9 July 1953: 8. Print.
 "Top Soviet Spy Goes on Trial." Sarasota Herald-Tribune [Sarasota, Florida] 2 November 1953: 1. Print.
 "Alexander Rado." Central Intelligence Agency. Central Intelligence Agency, 15 November 2013. Web. 27 December 2015.
 Ambrose, Stephen E. Ike's Spies. Garden City, New York: Doubleday & Company Inc, 1981. Print.
 Bauer, Eddy, Peter Young, James Lawton Collins, and Correlli Barnett. Illustrated World War II Encyclopedia: An Unbiased Account of the Most Devastating War Known to Mankind ... Contains the Original Text Previously Published in the United Kingdom plus Background Articles by a Group of Distinguished Historians ... Enlivened with Color Photographs Recently Uncovered. Place of Publication Not Identified: H.S. Stuttman, 1978. Print.
 
 
 "'Rote Drei' Agent Files." The National Archives. N.p., May 2004. Web. 27 December 2015.
 "Rudolf Roessler." SpyMuseumcom the 1 Resource for Espionage on the Web. 19 March 2015. Web. 27 December 2015.
 
 Time-Life Books, ed. WW II: Time-Life Books History of the Second World War. 1st ed. New York: Prentice Hall, 1989. Print. 
 Volkman, Ernest. "Rudolf Roessler: The Enigma of Lucy." Spies: The Secret Agents Who Changed the Course of History. New York: J. Wiley, 1994. 237-46. Print.

See also
 Vita Novi Swiss publishing house created by Roessler

References

Bibliography

 
 
 
 
 

Red Orchestra (espionage)
German spies for the Soviet Union
World War II spies for the Soviet Union
1897 births
1958 deaths
People from Kaufbeuren
People convicted of spying for Czechoslovakia
German Protestants
Soviet spies against Western Europe
Czechoslovak spies against West Germany
Czechoslovak spies against the United States
Cold War spymasters